Dunama tuna is a moth in the  family Notodontidae. It is found in Colombia.

The length of the forewings is 12–19 mm for males and about 22 mm for females.

References

Moths described in 1901
Notodontidae of South America